Bojana Jovanovski was the defending champion, but she lost in the final to Karin Knapp who won her first WTA title without losing a set.

Seeds

Draw

Finals

Top half

Bottom half

Qualifying

Seeds

Qualifiers

Qualifying draw

First qualifier

Second qualifier

Third qualifier

Fourth qualifier

References
Main Draw
Qualifying Draw

2014 WTA Tour
Singles